Admiral Sir Wilfrid John Wentworth Woods,  (9 February 1906 – 1 January 1975) was a Royal Navy officer who served in the Submarine Service in the Mediterranean.

Early life 
Wilfrid Woods was born on 19 February 1906 at Southsea in Hampshire to colonial administrator Sir Wilfrid Woods KCMG, KBE and Ethel Maud Palmer. He attended school at Seabrooke Lodge at Hythe before going to the Royal Naval College, Osborne and the Britannia Royal Naval College.

Royal Navy

Pre-war service 
Woods was commissioned into the Royal Navy as a sub-lieutenant in 1926 and specialised in submarines. His first submarine command came in 1935 as a lieutenant in  before promotion to lieutenant-commander in  a year later. He then attended the Royal Navy Staff College in 1939.

Second World War 
For his work in Triumph he was awarded the DSO and bar as well as the White Eagle of Yugoslavia. Woods moved to become staff officer (operations) on the staff of the Commander in Chief, Mediterranean. 

Leaving the Mediterranean to participate in Operation Overlord he was appointed to command . The ship was scuttled as part of a Mulberry Harbour.

Post war service 
 was his next command along with command with the 3rd Submarine Flotilla. His career took him on to Chief Staff Officer to Flag Officer Submarines in 1947. He went to the Imperial Defence College in 1951 following a period as Director of Torpedo, Anti-submarine and Mine Warfare. He was promoted from commodore to rear-admiral in 1955.

Woods' next appointment saw him serve as Flag Officer Submarines from December 1955 to November 1957. From there he was promoted to vice-admiral in 1958 and made NATO Deputy Supreme Allied Commander, Atlantic. He rose to the rank of admiral in July 1960 and appointed to the post of Commander in Chief Home Fleet and then NATO Commander in Chief, Eastern Atlantic Area. In May 1962 he was made First and Principal Naval ADC to Queen Elizabeth II.

He was Commander in Chief, Portsmouth and Allied Commander in Chief, Channel between 1963 and his retirement in 1965.

Later life 
After retiring from the Royal Navy, he was Deputy Lieutenant for Hampshire and spent four years as chairman of the RNLI. During his chairmanship the boat building programme was expanded and a £400,000 deficit cleared.

References

Bibliography
Richard Compton-Hall, Woods, Sir Wilfrid John Wentworth (1906–1975), Oxford Dictionary of National Biography, Oxford University Press, 2004 retrieved 18 Aug 2008

|-

|-

|-

Companions of the Order of the Bath
Knights Grand Cross of the Order of the British Empire
Knights Commander of the Order of the Bath
Order of George I
Deputy Lieutenants of Hampshire
Knights Bachelor
Royal Navy admirals
Royal Navy officers of World War II
1906 births
1975 deaths
Graduates of Britannia Royal Naval College
People educated at the Royal Naval College, Osborne
Graduates of the Royal College of Defence Studies
Graduates of the Royal Naval College, Greenwich
Companions of the Distinguished Service Order
People from Southsea
Military personnel from Portsmouth